Podgrađe is a village in the municipality of Gornji Vakuf, Bosnia and Herzegovina. Village has population of 467 people according census 2013

Demographics 
According to the 2013 census, its population was 467.

References

Populated places in Gornji Vakuf-Uskoplje